François-Augustin de Paradis de Moncrif (1687, Paris – 19 November 1770, Paris) was a French writer and poet, of a family originally of Scots origin. He was appointed historiographer royal to Louis XV of France. His parody of owlishly pedantic scholarship, Histoire des chats, and the protection of the house of Orléans gained him entry to the Académie française. Maurepas records in his memoirs that at the induction ceremony, a member let loose a cat he had secreted in his pocket: the cat miaowed, the Académiciens miaowed and the serious oration dissolved in laughter.

Works 
 Les Aventures de Zeloïde et d'Amanzarifdine, contes indiens, 1715
 La Fausse magie, prose comedy in 3 acts, Comédie Italienne, 1719
 L'Oracle de Delphes, verse comedy in 3 acts, Comédie-Française, 1722; adapted from La Fontaine's Le Mari confesseur, it was interdicted at the fourth performance, its satire against paganism appearing to be applicable to the Christian religion. 
 Histoire des Chats : dissertation sur la prééminence des chats dans la société, sur les autres animaux d'Égypte, sur les distinctions et privilèges dont ils ont joui personnellement, 1727
 Les Abdérites, verse comedy in 1 act, 1732
 L'Empire de l'Amour, ballet en vers libres, 1733
 Essais sur la Necessité et sur les Moyens de Plaire, 1738 
 Les Ames rivales, novel 1738 
 Œuvres mêlées, 1743
 Zélindor, roi des Sylphes, ballet libretto, music by François Francœur and François Rebel, presented at Versailles 17 March 1745
 Poésies chrétiennes composées par ordre de la Reine, 1747
 Almasis, ballet, 1748
 Ismène, pastorale héroïque, 1748
 Observations pour servir à l'histoire des gens de lettres qui ont vécu dans ce siècle, 1751
 La Sybille, ballet music by Antoine Dauvergne presented at Versailles,  13 November 1753
 Enée et Lavinie (with Bernard le Bovier de Fontenelle), lyric tragedy in 5 actst music by Antoine Dauvergne, presented at the Académie royale de musique, 14 February 1758
 Les Fêtes d'Euterpe (with Charles-Simon Favart), opera-ballet,  music by Antoine Dauvergne, presented at the Académie royale de musique, 8 August 1758
 Erosine, pastorale héroïque, 1765

External links 
 Les Chats/The Cats at the EX-Classics Project. Versions in both French and English; can be read online or downloaded in various formats.
 François-Augustin de Paradis de Moncrif on data.bnf.fr
 Francois-Augustin de Paradis de Moncrif's Love of Cats
 Productions of his plays on CÉSAR

1687 births
1770 deaths
Writers from Paris
18th-century French dramatists and playwrights
18th-century French poets
French opera librettists
French people of English descent
18th-century French male writers
Members of the Académie Française